The 2008 San Diego City Attorney election occurred on Tuesday, November 4, 2008. The primary election was held on Tuesday, June 3, 2008.

Municipal elections in California are officially non-partisan, although most members do identify a party preference. A two-round system was used for the election, starting with a primary in June followed by a runoff in November between the top-two candidates.

Results

References 

San Diego City Attorney
San Diego City Attorney elections